.mail is a generic top-level domain originally proposed by The Spamhaus Project in 2004, but rejected by ICANN.  Its purpose was to enable responsible message recipients to reliably and efficiently identify and accept spam-free mailstreams.  The ICANN Board issued a resolution on February 4, 2018 to cease the processing of all applications for the .corp, .home, and .mail gTLDs.

Proposed core functionality 
.mail was an attempt to reduce the spam problem by maintaining a list of domains authenticated as both not belonging to known spammers, and providing verified contact information. The sTLD would contain the actual hostnames of servers used to send mail. A .mail domain would only be able to be registered by a party that already owns a domain in another TLD which has been in operation for at least six months, and whose WHOIS information has been verified for accuracy.  The domain was intended to be a publicly curated resources that could be updated as needed by the Internet.

Technical concerns 
Investigation into the conflicts regarding gTLDs that are in use in internal networks was conducted at ICANN's request by Interisle Consulting.  The resulting report was to become known as the Name Collision issue, which was first reported at ICANN 47.  This decision affected the proposed .corp, .home, and .mail gTLDs.

See also 
 Top Level Domain
 Generic top-level domain
 .corp rejected gTLD
 .home rejected gTLD

References

External links 
 .mail ICANN Wiki
 Spamhaus FAQ: The .mail TLD

Proposed top-level domains
Rejected proposed top-level domains

sv:Toppdomän#Generiska toppdomäner